Raja Rajeswari is a criminal court judge in New York. She is the first Indian American and South Asian woman judge in the state. She graduated from Brooklyn Law School in 1998.

See also
List of Asian American jurists
List of first women lawyers and judges in New York

References

Brooklyn Law School alumni
Living people
Year of birth missing (living people)